Joe Irving (born 8 June 1998) is a British motorcycle racer.

Career statistics

Grand Prix motorcycle racing

By season

Races by year

References

External links
http://www.motogp.com/en/riders/Joe+Irving
https://web.archive.org/web/20160205230631/http://www.britishsuperbike.com/support/2012/125gp.aspx

1998 births
Living people
British motorcycle racers
Moto3 World Championship riders
People from Holmfirth